Major General Jayantha de S. Jayaratne, VSV (died 1988) was a Sri Lankan army officer, who was the former Commander Security Forces Headquarters - Jaffna (SF HQ (J)).

Educated at Royal College, Colombo, where he was contemporizes of Lalith Athulathmudali. He joined the Ceylon Army after completing his schooling and received his basic officer training at the Royal Military Academy, Sandhurst. On his return to Ceylon he was commissioned as a Second Lieutenant in the 4th Field Regiment, Ceylon Artillery. He was the first to become qualified as an Instructor in Gunnery. In 1963, he was transferred to the newly formed 4th Field Regiment following the attempted military coup.  He served as the commanding officer of the 4th Field Regiment, Sri Lanka Artillery February 1981 to January 1982.  

Major General Jayaratne was a graduate of the National Defence College, India. He was awarded the Vishista Seva Vibhushanaya (VSV) in 1987 and died in 1988.

References 

Year of birth missing
1988 deaths
Sri Lankan major generals
Alumni of Royal College, Colombo
Graduates of the Royal Military Academy Sandhurst
Sri Lanka Artillery officers
Sinhalese military personnel